Kireedam (Malayalam, Tamil "The Crown") can refer to either:

 Kireedam (1989 film), a Malayalam film directed by Sibi Malayil and starring Mohanlal
 Kireedam (2007 film), a Tamil film and the remake of the Malayalam film, directed by A. L. Vijay and starring Ajithkumar